HDMS Danbjørn (sometimes referred to as Danbjoern) is a Danish icebreaker built for breaking and reporting ice in the sea for Danish Ice Service in 1965. Originally operated by the Ministry of Industrial Affairs, Danbjørn was manned by the Royal Danish Navy throughout its history, but was officially incorporated in the navy on January 1, 1996.

The purpose of the ship is to assist shipping to and from Danish ports among these the most important supply and export ports, during ice conditions in the Danish waters within the Skaw. The shipping is assisted as close as possible to their port of destination where the remaining icebreaking is taken over by the port’s own icebreaking resources. Assistance is given according to the following priority:

 Ships in distress.
 Ships transporting live animals.
 Ships transporting passengers.
 Ships transporting cargoes of special importance.
 All ships in need.

The action from Danbjørn is seen each winter from December 15 to March 31, along with Isbjørn.

Sources
 Specification as on Navy Site
 Ships Specification
 Navy Ice Service
 Ice Breaking Assistance
 Ice Breaking Service

References

1965 ships
Icebreakers
Naval ships of Denmark